Open Physics is a peer-reviewed open access scientific journal covering all aspects of physics. It is published by De Gruyter and the editor-in-chief is Sally Seidel (University of New Mexico). Occasionally, the journal publishes special issues on a specific topic.

History
The journal was established in 2003 as the Central European Journal of Physics. It was co-published by Versita and Springer Science+Business Media. The founding editor-in-chief was Janos Lendvai (Eötvös Loránd University), who was succeeded in 2004 by Vladimir E. Zakharov (University of Arizona and Lebedev Physical Institute) and in 2011 by Feng.

In 2014 the journal was moved to De Gruyter. It obtained its current name in 2015 and simultaneously became open access.

Abstracting and indexing 
The journals is abstracted and indexed in:

According to the Journal Citation Reports, the journal has a 2021 impact factor of 1.361.

References

External links 
 

Physics journals
Publications established in 2003
English-language journals
Creative Commons Attribution-licensed journals
De Gruyter academic journals